Phalonidia chlorolitha is a species of moth of the family Tortricidae. It is found in China (Gansu, Hebei, Heilongjiang, Henan, Hubei, Jilin, Liaoning, Ningxia, Shanxi, Sichuan, Zhejiang), Japan, Korea and Russia.

The wingspan is 15−19 mm.

References

Moths described in 1931
Phalonidia